The Green Mountain Tunnel is a mine drainage tunnel in Schuylkill County, Pennsylvania, in the United States. It is one of five major mine drainage tunnels in the watershed of Catawissa Creek. The tunnel discharges into Catawissa Creek near the Audenried Tunnel and the Catawissa Tunnel. The tunnel was constructed in the 1930s and is slightly less than one mile long.

Hydrology
The average discharge of the Green Mountain Tunnel is 1,440,000 gallons per day (1,000 gallons per minute or 1.75 cubic feet per second). Although a significant majority of the acid mine drainage discharging into Catawissa Creek comes from the Audenried Tunnel, the Green Mountain Tunnel is one of four other mine drainage tunnels that contribute most of the remaining acid mine drainage to the creek.

The pH of the waters of the Green Mountain Tunnel ranges from 3.6 to 4.2, with an average of 4.05. The tunnel's acidity load requires a 92 percent reduction to meet its total maximum daily load requirements.

The iron load requires a 49 percent reduction to meet its total maximum daily load requirements. The load of manganese requires a 3 percent reduction to meet its total maximum daily load requirements. The load of manganese requires an 89 percent reduction to meet its total maximum daily load requirements.

The concentration of hydrogen ions in the waters of the Green Mountain Tunnel is 0.25318 milligrams per liter. The concentration of sulfates ranges from 75.0 to 96.0 milligrams per liter.

The temperature of the water being discharged from the Green Mountain Tunnel was measured to be  on April 15, 1975.

Description and geography
It is entirely in East Union Township, Schuylkill County, Pennsylvania and discharges near Catawissa Creek. The location where it discharges into the creek is near where the Audenried Tunnel and the Catawissa Tunnel discharge into the creek.

The Green Mountain Tunnel drains the eastern part of the South Green Mountain Coal Basin.

The discharge of the Green Mountain Tunnel is in an undeveloped area.

The Green Mountain Tunnel is near Spies Run.

History
Mining in the North Green Mountain Coal Basin and the South Green Mountain Coal Basin began in the middle of the 1800s. The construction of the Green Mountain Tunnel was completed in the South Green Mountain Coal Basin the early 1930s. It was one of five mine drainage tunnels to be constructed in the watershed of Catawissa Creek during this decade (the others being the Audenried Tunnel, the Catawissa Tunnel, the Oneida Number One Tunnel, and the Oneida Number Three Tunnel). Its original purpose was to drain water from deep mines in the South Green Mountain Coal Basin.

A plan was once conceived to treat one million gallons per day of the waters of the Green Mountain Tunnel to the point that it would be potable and sell it to the Humboldt Industrial Park. This plan would allow the Humboldt Industrial Park to expand and provide 4,800 additional jobs.

In 2000, the Catawissa Creek Restoration Association received $35,000 to construct a vertical flow system for the Green Mountain Tunnel. The Catawissa Creek Restoration Association began making basic plans to construct a treatment system for the Green Mountain Tunnel as early as 2003. The Audenried & Green Mountain Tunnel Wetlands Delineation and Identification was completed in 2004 by the Eastern Pennsylvania Council for Abandoned Mine Reclamation.

The Green Mountain Tunnel is not on the Pennsylvania Section 303(d) list of streams that are impaired due to pH.

See also
Audenried Tunnel coal mining drainage in Luzerne County
Catawissa Tunnel coal mining drainage in Schuylkill County
Jeddo Tunnel coal mining drainage in Luzerne County
Oneida Number One Tunnel coal mining drainage in Schuylkill County
Oneida Number Three Tunnel coal mining drainage in Schuylkill County
Quakake Tunnel coal mining drainage in Carbon County

References

External links
Image of the Green Mountain Tunnel discharge

Drainage tunnels in the United States
Tunnels in Pennsylvania
Buildings and structures in Schuylkill County, Pennsylvania
Coal mining in the United States
1930s establishments in Pennsylvania
Tributaries of Catawissa Creek
Tunnels completed in the 1930s
Mining in Pennsylvania
Environment of Pennsylvania